Crooked Creek is an impact crater in Crawford County, Missouri, United States.

The crater is exposed to the surface.

This is one of the 38th parallel structures, a series of circular depressions stretching across the central United States, thought to possibly be the result of a serial impact.

See also 
 Decaturville crater
 Weaubleau structure

References 

Impact craters of the United States
Carboniferous impact craters
Permian impact craters
Landforms of Crawford County, Missouri